The Canary Islands quail (Coturnix gomerae) is an extinct quail species that once occurred on the islands of El Hierro, La Palma, Tenerife and Fuerteventura (Canary Islands, Spain).

Extinction 
This quail was most likely still present in the Canary Islands after humans settled there. Cats could have been one of the causes of the disappearance of some little flying birds like the Canary Islands quail.

See also 
 List of extinct birds
 List of extinct animals
 List of extinct animals of Europe

References 
 Jaume, D.; McMinn, M. & Alcover, J. A. (1993): Fossil bird from the Bujero del Silo, La Gomera (Canary Islands), with a description of a new species of Quail (Galliformes; Phasianidae). Boletin do Museu Municipal de Funchal 2: 147–165.

External links 
 The Extinction Website

Coturnix
Late Quaternary prehistoric birds
Quails
Birds of the Canary Islands
Holocene extinctions
Birds described in 1993
Extinct birds of Atlantic islands